The 2019 Arkansas State Red Wolves football team represented Arkansas State University in the 2019 NCAA Division I FBS football season. The Red Wolves played their home games at Centennial Bank Stadium in Jonesboro, Arkansas, and competed in the West Division of the Sun Belt Conference. They were led by sixth-year head coach Blake Anderson.

Schedule
Arkansas State announced its 2019 football schedule on March 1, 2019. The 2019 schedule consists of 6 home and away games in the regular season.

Schedule Source:

Game summaries

SMU

at UNLV

Week 3: at #3 Georgia

Southern Illinois

at Troy

at Georgia State

Louisiana

Texas State

at Louisiana–Monroe

Coastal Carolina

Georgia Southern

at South Alabama

vs. FIU (Camellia Bowl)

References

Arkansas State
Arkansas State Red Wolves football seasons
Camellia Bowl champion seasons
Arkansas State Red Wolves football